Oskar Gustav Jæger (16 June 1864 – 19 August 1933) was a Norwegian economist and politician. He obtained the cand.jur. degree in 1897 and was appointed research fellow in national economics in 1898. He was Professor of Economics (1902–1930) at the Faculty of Law of The Royal Frederick University, and served as Dean of the Faculty of Law 1909–1911.

He was the brother of Hans Jæger.

References 

Norwegian economists
Academic staff of the Faculty of Law, University of Oslo
1933 deaths
1864 births